Nicola Kraus (born August 17, 1974) is an American novelist.

Personal life
Kraus was born in New York City, and graduated from the Chapin School and then New York University's Gallatin School of Individualized Study. She met Emma McLaughlin while both were attending  New York University, and working as nannies. She lived as a child at 1000 Park Avenue, whose residents she claims inspired some of the characters in her fiction.

Kraus married David Wheir on June 14, 2008.

Published works (all with Emma McLaughlin)
 The Nanny Diaries (2002)
 Citizen Girl (2004)
 Dedication (2007)
 The Real Real (2009)
 Nanny Returns (2009)
 Cinderella Gets a Brazilian (2011)
 Over You (2012)
 The First Affair: A Novel (2013)
 How to be a Grown-Up: A Novel (2015)

External links
 Emma McLaughlin and Nicola Kraus homepage
 Interview with Emma McLaughlin
 Barnes & Noble Biography

1974 births
21st-century American novelists
American women novelists
American chick lit writers
Living people
New York University Gallatin School of Individualized Study alumni
Writers from Manhattan
21st-century American women writers
Chapin School (Manhattan) alumni
People from the Upper East Side
Novelists from New York (state)